Laurence Stephen Kynaston (born 24 February 1994) is a Welsh actor. He won an Evening Standard Theatre Award for his performance in The Son, as well as receiving a WhatsOnStage Award nomination. He starred in the BBC Two sitcom Cradle to Grave (2015) and the films England Is Mine (2017) and How to Build a Girl (2019). He was named a 2018 Screen International Star of Tomorrow.

Kynaston was eighteen when he was cast in The Winslow Boy at Theatr Clwyd. He made his West End debut in The Ferryman when it transferred to the Gielgud Theatre. He starred in the Spring Awakening revival at the Almeida Theatre.

Early life
Kynaston was born in Shrewsbury and grew up on a farm on the North Wales–Shropshire border, the youngest of four boys. His mother is a school nurse and cellist, and his brothers are all musicians. He joined the National Youth Theatre of Wales. He attended Llanfyllin High School. He co-founded the Lonely Tree Theatre Group. He moved to London when he was nineteen.

Filmography

Film

Television

Video games

Music videos

Stage

Audio

Awards and nominations

References

External links
 
 Laurie Kynaston at Conway van Gelder Grant

Living people
1994 births
21st-century Welsh male actors
Actors from Shrewsbury
People from Montgomeryshire
People from Wrexham County Borough
Welsh male musical theatre actors